Crackerjack is a 1938 British comedy crime film directed by Albert de Courville and starring Tom Walls, Lilli Palmer and Noel Madison. It was made at Pinewood Studios with sets designed by Walter Murton. The film was released in the U.S. as Man With 100 Faces.

Plot
Three men rob a millionaire of diamonds aboard an airliner in flight. When Police Superintendent Benting tries to intervene, Jack Drake, another passenger, knocks him out to save him from being shot. The thieves force the pilot to land so they can dump the passengers. However, the men find the diamonds have already been stolen by someone else (Drake).

Drake is a sort of modern-day Robin Hood. He donates the proceeds of his latest robbery to fund the stalled construction of the "New Social Institute". He even writes a book, "Crackerjack": The true story of my exploits., which becomes a bestseller. Everybody is reading it, including the people at Scotland Yard and Baroness Von Haltz, and wondering if it is fact or fiction. The baroness tells her maid Annie that certain passages somehow remind her of Drake, who broke her heart.

By coincidence, she is residing in the same hotel as Drake. He goes to see her, but she does not forgive him for leaving her without a word in Berlin. He explains that he was forced to leave suddenly, but she is not mollified.

Meanwhile, Drake instructs Burdge, his secretary, to send a cheque for £10,000 to the Buckingham Hospital for a new wing, even though Burdge informs him he is overdrawn at the bank. Drake tells him that the wealthy Mrs. Humbold's pearls will provide ample funds. The Humbolds are hosting a masquerade ball that night, and the baroness will be there.

At the ball, part of the entertainment is a group called the "Four Gangsters", who have been tied up and replaced by a gang of real gangsters, the same thieves from the aeroplane caper. Sculpie, their leader, kills an unarmed man who foolishly tries to resist. Afterward, however, Sculpie is furious to learn that the pearls he took from Mrs. Humbold are fakes. Once again, Drake has the real ones.

An advertisement in the newspaper asking for Crackerjack's help intrigues Drake. He arranges to meet the person in trouble, who turns out to be the baroness, although he speaks with her indirectly, not face to face. She asks him to retrieve letters being used as blackmail by Hambro Golding. Drake is especially interested when she informs him that the letters prevent her from marrying. He promises to attend to the matter the next night. Unaware that Golding is actually a member of Sculpie's gang, she innocently informs him that Crackerjack will try to burgle his safe for the non-existent letters (Golding told her that Crackerjack had stolen his ring, a family heirloom). Sculpie is delighted. However, when the baroness returns for her forgotten handbag, she overhears the gang discussing Crackerjack's fate.

Suspecting that Drake is Crackerjack, she tries to stop him by making a dinner engagement with him, but when he does not show up at the appointed time, she makes Burdge take her to Golding's place. Drake is caught, but manages to turn the tables on the gang. He has also arranged for the police to raid the house as well. Drake gets away and flies off with the baroness to get married.

Cast
 Tom Walls - [Jack] Drake 
 Lilli Palmer - Baroness Von Haltz  
 Noel Madison - Sculpie  
 Leon M. Lion - [Hambro] Golding 
 Edmund Breon - [Tony] Davenport
 Jack Lester - Boyne  
 Charles Heslop - Burdge
 H.G. Stoker - Supt. Benting  
 Henry B. Longhurst - Inspt. Lunt  
 Ethel Griffies - Annie 
 Edmund D'Alby - Lug  
 Muriel George - Mrs. Humbold 
 Andreas Malandrinos - Ducet  
 Fewlass Llewellyn - Weller  
 Hal Walters - Smithy  
 Burton Pierce - Specialty Dance

References

Bibliography
 Wood, Linda. British Films 1927-1939. BFI, 1986.

External links

1938 films
1930s crime comedy films
British black-and-white films
British crime comedy films
1930s English-language films
Films based on Irish novels
Films directed by Albert de Courville
Films set in London
Films shot at Pinewood Studios
Gainsborough Pictures films
1938 comedy films
1930s British films